Malone College may refer to:

Malone College (Northern Ireland)  in Belfast, Northern Ireland
Malone University, formerly Malone College, in  Canton, Ohio, USA